Fuya Godwin Kimbita (born 7 November 1967) is a Tanzanian CCM politician and Member of Parliament for Hai constituency in the National Assembly of Tanzania since 2005.

References

Living people
Chama Cha Mapinduzi MPs
Tanzanian MPs 2010–2015
1967 births